Robert Pickett may refer to:

 Bobby Pickett (Robert George Pickett, 1938–2007), American singer also known Bobby "Boris" Pickett
 Bob Pickett (Robert A. Pickett, 1932–2010), head coach of the University of Massachusetts Amherst football team
 Robert W. Pickett (born c. 1953), gunman in the 2001 White House shooting